Milton Morris Silverman (1910–1997) was an American drug researcher, an investigator of the international pharmaceutical industry, and science editor of the San Francisco Chronicle. He co-authored Pills, Profits and Politics with Philip R. Lee.

References 

1910 births
1997 deaths
American pharmacologists